Cammack may refer to:

Places:
Cammack, Indiana, unincorporated town in Mount Pleasant Township, Delaware County, Indiana, US
Cammack Village, Arkansas, city in Pulaski County, Arkansas, US

People:
Eric Cammack (born 1975), American baseball player
James Cammack (born 1956), African American bassist from New York
Kat Cammack (born 1988), American politician
Steve Cammack (born 1954), English footballer